Walter Quintin Gresham (March 17, 1832May 28, 1895) was a United States circuit judge of the United States Court of Appeals for the Seventh Circuit and of the United States Circuit Courts for the Seventh Circuit and previously was a United States District Judge of the United States District Court for the District of Indiana. He served as Postmaster General of the United States and United States Secretary of the Treasury under President Chester A. Arthur and as United States Secretary of State under President Grover Cleveland.

Education and career

Born on March 17, 1832, near Lanesville, Indiana, Gresham read law in 1854. He entered private practice in Corydon, Indiana from 1854 to 1860. He was active as a campaign speaker for the Republican ticket in 1856, and in 1860 was elected to the Indiana House of Representatives as a Republican in a strong Democratic district. In the House, as Chairman of the Committee on Military Affairs, he did much to prepare the Indiana troops for service in the Federal army.

Gresham served in the United States Army from 1861 to 1865 during the American Civil War, and returned to private practice in New Albany, Indiana from 1866 to 1867. He was an agent for handling Indiana state finances from 1867 to 1869.

Civil War service

Gresham was commissioned lieutenant colonel of the 38th Indiana Volunteer Infantry on September 18, 1861. In December of that year, he was promoted to colonel and placed in command of the 53rd Indiana Volunteer Infantry. The 53rd Indiana Infantry subsequently took part in Grant's Tennessee campaign of 1862, including the Siege of Corinth and Battle of Vicksburg. During the Siege of Vicksburg, Colonel Gresham commanded a brigade. In August 1863, he was appointed brigadier general of volunteers, and was placed in command of the Federal forces at Natchez, Mississippi. In 1864, he commanded a division of the XVII Corps in Sherman's Atlanta Campaign, and before the Battle of Atlanta, on July 20, he received a gunshot wound to his knee that forced him to retire from active service, and left him lame for life. In 1865 he was appointed a brevet major general of volunteers.

District Court service

Gresham received a recess appointment from President Ulysses S. Grant on September 1, 1869, to a seat on the United States District Court for the District of Indiana vacated by Judge David McDonald. He was nominated to the same position by President Grant on December 6, 1869, was confirmed by the United States Senate on December 21, 1869, and received his commission on December 21, 1869. His service terminated on April 9, 1883 due to his resignation.

Cabinet offices
During April 1883, Gresham succeeded Timothy O. Howe as Postmaster General of the United States in President Chester A. Arthur's cabinet, taking an active part in the suppression of the Louisiana Lottery, and in September 1884, he succeeded Charles J. Folger as United States Secretary of the Treasury. In the following month he resigned to accept a federal judicial post.

Court of Appeals/Circuit Court service

Gresham received a recess appointment from President Chester A. Arthur on October 28, 1884, to a seat on the United States Circuit Courts for the Seventh Circuit vacated by Judge Thomas Drummond. He was nominated to the same position by President Arthur on December 3, 1884, was confirmed by the United States Senate on December 9, 1884, and received his commission the same day. Gresham was assigned by operation of law to additional and concurrent service on the United States Court of Appeals for the Seventh Circuit on June 16, 1891, to a new seat authorized by 26 Stat. 826 (Evarts Act). His service terminated on March 3, 1893, due to his resignation.

Swing in political philosophy, Secretary of State service and death

Gresham was a candidate for the Republican presidential nomination in 1884 and 1888, in the latter year leading for some time in the balloting. His 1888 candidacy was supported by several notable agrarian unions, including The Agricultural Wheel, Grange and Farmer's Alliance. Gradually, however, he grew out of sympathy with the Republican leaders and policy, and in 1892 advocated the election of the Democratic candidate, Grover Cleveland, for the presidency. Gresham was United States Secretary of State in President Grover Cleveland's cabinet from 1893 to 1895. He died on May 28, 1895, in Washington, D.C. He is interred in Arlington National Cemetery.

Family

Gresham was born to William Gresham (1802–1834) and his wife Sarah Davis. William had been elected a Colonel in the militia of Indiana, was a member of the Whig Party, and was elected Sheriff of Harrison County, Indiana. On January 26, 1834, William was fatally stabbed while assisting in the arrest of Levi Sipes, a so-called "desperado". Walter's paternal grandparents were George Gresham (born 1776) and Mary Pennington. George was born in Virginia but later settled in Kentucky. He moved to Indiana in 1809. Mary was the only sister of Dennis Pennington, speaker of the first Indiana Senate. George Gresham was a son of Lawrence Gresham. Lawrence was born in England but moved to the Colony of Virginia in 1759. He initially served as an indentured servant of an uncle. He was released from service upon reaching adulthood and later served in the Continental Army. He married Matilda McGrain. One of his grandsons was U.S. Representative Walter G. Andrews of New York. Lawrence followed his son to Kentucky and Indiana well into his old age.

Honors
Gresham is the eponym of communities in Oregon, Nebraska and Wisconsin.

See also

List of American Civil War generals (Union)

References

External links
 

1832 births
1895 deaths
19th-century American judges
19th-century American politicians
Arthur administration cabinet members
Burials at Arlington National Cemetery
Cleveland administration cabinet members
Gresham, Oregon
Indiana Democrats
Indiana Republicans
Indiana Whigs
Judges of the United States circuit courts
Judges of the United States District Court for the District of Indiana
Members of the Indiana House of Representatives
People from Harrison County, Indiana
People of Indiana in the American Civil War
Union Army generals
United States federal judges appointed by Chester A. Arthur
United States federal judges appointed by Ulysses S. Grant
United States Postmasters General
Candidates in the 1888 United States presidential election
United States Secretaries of State
United States Secretaries of the Treasury